Bulinus mutandensis is a species of freshwater gastropod in the Planorbidae family. It is endemic to Uganda. Its natural habitat is freshwater lakes.

References

Bulinus
Endemic fauna of Uganda
Gastropods described in 1913
Taxonomy articles created by Polbot